New Missamari railway station is a railway station on Rangiya–Murkongselek section under Rangiya railway division of Northeast Frontier Railway zone. This railway station is situated at Missamari in Sonitpur district in the Indian state of Assam.

Major Trains
 New Delhi–Dibrugarh Rajdhani Express (Via Rangapara North)
Naharlagun–Guwahati Shatabdi Express
Dibrugarh– Chennai Tambaram Express
Kamakhya–Dekargaon Intercity Express

References

Railway stations in Sonitpur district
Rangiya railway division